Oļegs Deņisovs  (born 1966) is a Latvian Russian politician. He is a member of the Socialist Party of Latvia and was a deputy of the 7th, 8th and 9th Saeima (Latvian Parliament).

References
http://www.cvk.lv/cgi-bin/wdbcgiw/base/saeima9.cvkand9.kandid2?NR1=&cbutton=54079835469

External links
Archive on Supreme Soviet and Saeima members since 1990

1966 births
Living people
Politicians from Riga
Latvian people of Russian descent
Socialist Party of Latvia politicians
Deputies of the 6th Saeima
Deputies of the 7th Saeima
Deputies of the 8th Saeima
Deputies of the 9th Saeima